Bolvașnița is a commune in Caraș-Severin County, western Romania, with a population of 1,573 people. It is composed of two villages, Bolvașnița and Vârciorova (Varcsaró). It is situated in the historical region of Banat.

References

Communes in Caraș-Severin County
Localities in Romanian Banat
Place names of Slavic origin in Romania